The H. C. Wells Double House is a historic house at 28-30 Dresser Street in Southbridge, Massachusetts.  The -story wood-frame duplex was built in the late 1880s or early 1890s by Hiram C. Wells, member of the Wells family which owned the locally important American Optical Company.  It was one of several duplexes Wells built in the area as an income property.  Although not as ornate as some Queen Anne houses, it features high quality construction methods despite a relatively simple symmetrical plan.  It features a granite foundation, diamond transom windows, and stained glass windows.

The house was listed on the National Register of Historic Places in 1989.

See also
National Register of Historic Places listings in Southbridge, Massachusetts
National Register of Historic Places listings in Worcester County, Massachusetts

References

Houses in Southbridge, Massachusetts
Queen Anne architecture in Massachusetts
Houses completed in 1888
National Register of Historic Places in Southbridge, Massachusetts
Houses on the National Register of Historic Places in Worcester County, Massachusetts